Titus Engel (born 1975) is a Swiss conductor with a focus on both contemporary opera and Baroque opera in historically informed performance.

Education 
Born in Zürich, Engel first studied musicology and philosophy at the University of Zurich and at the Humboldt University of Berlin, graduating with a master's degree. He then began studying conducting with Christian Kluttig at the Hochschule für Musik Carl Maria von Weber Dresden. He subsequently attended master classes with Sir Colin Davis, Peter Eötvös and Ilja Mussin. Furthermore, he worked as assistant to Sylvain Cambreling, Marc Albrecht and Peter Rundel.

Career 
Since then, he has directed many performances in different genres at various stages, for example Monteverdi's L'Orfeo at the  Berlin and at the Theater an der Wien, several operas at the Kampnagel Hamburg and in the Staatstheater Stuttgart up to Glass' Akhnaten at the Vlaamse Opera. At the invitation of Gerard Mortier, he made his debut at the Teatro Real Madrid with the world premiere of Pilar Jurado's La página en blancoim in February 2011, where he is now a regular guest: in 2014, he conducted the world premiere of Charles Wuorinen's opera Brokeback Mountain. In June 2016, he conducted the Swiss premiere and third complete performance ever of Stockhausen's Donnerstag from the cycle Licht at the Theater Basel. The production received the award "Performance of the Year" in the critics' poll of the Opernwelt 2016.

Engel has conducted numerous renowned orchestras such as the orchestra of the Paris Opéra, the Orchestra of the Deutsche Oper Berlin, the Mozarteum Orchestra Salzburg, several Radio orchestras, the Orquesta Sinfónica de Castilla y León, the Bern Symphony Orchestra, the Mahler Chamber Orchestra, the Danish National Chamber Orchestra as well as several chamber orchestras in southern Germany and Switzerland. He is also regularly invited to perform with leading ensembles for contemporary music. From 2000 to 2012, he was musical director of the ensemble courage. He has premiered numerous works (Sergej Newski, Leo Dick, Elena Mendoza, Olga Neuwirth, Rebecca Saunders) among others by the RuhrTriennale, the Berliner Festspiele, the Lucerne Festival, the MaerzMusik, the Donaueschinger Musiktage, the Salzburg Festival and the Opera d'hoy Madrid.

Projects in 2017 included the world premieres of Elena Mendoza's opera La ciudad de las mentirasaus at the Teatro Real Madrid and Mozart's La Betulia Liberata at the Oper Frankfurt.

Die Deutsche Bühne described him as a "conducting dervish" who safely guided all actors through breakneck rapids.

Recordings 
Engel has recorded numerous works for radio, television and CDs, including WERGO Benjamin Schweitzer's chamber music with ensemble courage and the Project 21 prelude, with works by H. Pohjanorro, P. Haapanen, R. Gubler and C. Neidhöfer, ensemble courage at en-avant records. In collaboration with ZDF-ARTE, he realised several first recordings of historical and contemporary silent film music. 
The recording of the premiere of the opera Brokeback Mountain was released as a DVD in autumn 2015.

Awards 
 2003: Fellow der American Academy of Conducting Aspen under the direction of David Zinman
 2002–2005: Sponsorship by the German Music Council (Dirigentenforum).
 2016: "Performance of the Year" with Donnerstag from Licht at the Opernwelt critics' poll
2020: "Conductor of the Year" in the Opernwelt critics' poll (together with Kirill Petrenko).

Trivia 
Together with Viktor Schoner, Engel initiated the Academy Musiktheater Heute and the Ligerzer Opernwerkstatt He is the editor of several books on contemporary opera.

Publications 
 Generation-Oper: fünfzehn junge Kommentare zur Situation der Oper; Titus Engel, Stefan Fragner, Viktor Schoner; Pfau, 2001 
 Libretto: zeitgenössische Positionen von Komponisten, Schriftstellern und Interpreten zur Ligerzer Opernwerkstatt 2005; Titus Engel, Viktor Schoner; Pfau, 2006 
 Zeitgenössische Komische Oper: Positionen von Komponisten, Schriftstellern und Interpreten zur 3. Ligerzer Opernwerkstatt 2007; Titus Engel; Pfau, 2010

References

External links 
 
 
 

Swiss conductors (music)
1975 births
Living people
Musicians from Zürich
University of Zurich alumni
Humboldt University of Berlin alumni